Nebria testacea is a species of ground beetle in the Nebriinae subfamily that can be found in Greece and Turkey. It is also common on various European islands, such as Crete, Cyclades, and Dodecanese.

References

testacea
Beetles described in 1811
Beetles of Europe